The Bridgespan Group is a U.S. nonprofit organization in Boston, Massachusetts that provides management consulting to nonprofits and philanthropists. In addition to consulting, Bridgespan makes case studies freely available on its website and publications.

Bridgespan was launched in 1999 by Thomas Tierney, formerly managing director of Bain & Company, professor Jeffrey Bradach, from Harvard Business School, and Paul Carttar, formerly a vice president at Bain & Company. The organization has received substantial support from Bain, with whom it has maintained a close relationship. The firm current has 6 offices across the globe.

History

Bridgespan grew from a desire by Bain & Company to expand their support of nonprofits. The idea started by doing occasional pro bono work for nonprofits. Bain consultant Thomas Tierney had been involved with nonprofit work since the 1980s, but after becoming worldwide managing director, Tierney began to focus his attention on consulting for charities. Between 1995 and 1999, three studies about the nonprofit market were conducted. Establishing an industry concentration was considered and rejected, instead the decision was made to create an allied, yet still independent, entity called the Bridgespan Group.

In 1996 co-founder Jeff Bradach, a business professor and former Bain consultant, joined the company. In 1998, co-founder Paul Carttar, also a former Bain consultant, joined. Tierney pitched the idea of forming Bridgespan to his partners in 1999. He emphasized his desire for an ongoing partnership with Bain, which would accrue benefits (e.g., recruitment as well as public relations). Bain provided Bridgespan with a one million dollar grant for the first three years, in addition to administrative support and several loaned employees ("externs").  The organization was also initially supported by grants from the Bill & Melinda Gates Foundation, the William and Flora Hewlett Foundation, the Edna McConnell Clark Foundation and the Atlantic Philanthropies.

It has advised Bill & Melinda Gates Foundation, Ford Foundation, Bloomberg Philanthropies, the Rockefeller Foundation, YMCA of the USA, The Salvation Army, and the Sesame Workshop.

The group launched its first website, www.bridgespan.org, in 2000 and started operations from a Boston-based office. By fall of 2000, the organization had 27 employees and had opened an office in San Francisco. Their services emphasized analytical consulting.  Even with substantial subsidies, the assignments were too expensive for charities.

In 2003, Bridgespan created the "Bridgestar" initiative that focused on leadership development and professional's transition into nonprofit careers. The Bridgestar.org site merged with Bridgespan.org in 2012.

In 2005, it received 1,700 applications for 18 positions while claiming that they can only serve 10% of the domestic US demand.

Current operations

The Bridgespan Group's website is organized into several learning centers, focusing on particular aspects of nonprofit management, such as hiring, strategy and funding. The site is interactive and includes free access to resources—articles, podcasts, videos, Q&A sessions, as well as several Bridgespan case studies. The website also features an online job board.

The organization claims it specializes in helping clients to affect the greatest possible change with their charitable donations. It advises clients against spreading donations too thinly so "that they have no real impact."

References

Companies based in Boston
Philanthropic organizations based in the United States
Non-profit organizations based in Boston